Emma Jane Nedov (born 11 March 1996 in Sydney) is an Australian artistic gymnast that competed at the 2014 and 2018 World Championships. She is the 2013 and 2019 Australian National Champion on beam.

Early life 
Emma Jane Nedov was born on 11 March 1996 in Sydney. She began gymnastics when she was six years old at Epping YMCA. In 2004, Nedov developed a virus that caused "severe neck pain, headaches, and constant aching muscle pain" which forced her to temporarily quit gymnastics, but she recovered after four weeks of treatment.

Career

Junior career 
Nedov competed at her first Junior National Championships in 2010 where she won a silver on beam and a bronze with her team. At the 2011 Junior National Championships, Nedov won gold on uneven bars and balance beam, and she won bronze in the all-around and on floor exercise. The 2011 season was also successful for Nedov internationally; she won the all-around at a friendly meet against Great Britain. She also won gold at the 2011 Commonwealth Youth Games on balance beam.

Senior career

2012–2013 
Nedov became age-eligible for senior elite in 2012, but she missed the season due to injury. She returned at the 2013 National Championships and won the gold medal on balance beam. She made her senior international debut at the 2013 Dityatin Cup in St. Petersburg where she won the silver on balance beam behind Ekaterina Kramarenko and finished seventh on floor exercise.

2014 
Nedov began the 2014 season at the WOGA Classic where she finished ninth on balance beam. At the National Championships, Nedov won a silver on balance beam and finished fifth in the all-around and on vault. Nedov was selected to compete for Australia at the World Championships. In the qualification round, she scored a 14.266 on beam and was the first reserve for the final. The Australian team finished seventh in the team final, and Nedov contributed a 14.066 on beam. Nedov ended her season at the Élite Gym Massilia where she only competed beam, but she did not qualify for the event final.

2015 
Nedov began her season with a sixth place finish on beam at the City of Jesolo Trophy. She also placed sixth on beam at the National Championships. At the Summer Universiade, Nedov finished eighth in the all-around final and fifth in the team final and the balance beam final. Nedov won a silver medal in the all-around and a bronze medal on beam at a friendly meet against China. This competition was Nedov's last of the season due to an injury.

2016 
Nedov won a bronze medal with the Australian team at the Pacific Rim Championships. Nedov competed at the Olympic Test Event to help Australia in their attempt to qualify as a full team to the 2016 Olympic Games. The Australian team finished fifth and thus did not qualify. Nedov then competed at the National Championships where she won the bronze medal on beam, but ultimately Australia's sole Olympic spot went to Larrissa Miller. Nedov later remarked that Australia's failure to qualify as a team was extremely disappointing and she "actually considered retiring then." In the end, Nedov decided that she would continue compete and planned on retiring after the 2018 Commonwealth Games.

2017–2018 
In February and March, Nedov competed at World Cup events in Melbourne, Baku and Doha where she placed fifth, sixth and seventh, respectively, on balance beam. Early in 2017, Nedov tore her Achilles tendon in training. Afterwards, Nedov retired, but she later decided to comeback. On her decision to make a comeback, Nedov stated, "After having the time off, experiencing life without gymnastics and getting a proper job, I decided that I’d give my all and go for it one last time." Nedov returned to competition in September 2018 at the Australian Classic where she finished fourth in the all-around and won the gold on balance beam. Then, Nedov was selected to compete at the 2018 World Championships where she helped the Australian team finish fifteenth.

2019 
Nedov competed at the 2019 Melbourne World Cup where she won a silver on balance beam and finished fourth on floor exercise. In March 2019, Nedov starred in an advertisement for activewear brand Running Bare as a part of their "This One’s For Me" campaign. Nedov won the gold medal on beam at the Baku World Cup. At the National Championships, Nedov won the gold medal on balance beam and won the bronze medal in the all-around.

Competitive history

References

External links 
 
 Emma Nedov on Facebook
 Emma Nedov on Twitter

1996 births
Living people
Australian female artistic gymnasts
Sportswomen from New South Wales
Sportspeople from Sydney
21st-century Australian women